OurStory Scotland is a community history and oral history project  founded in 2002 to record the histories of Scotland's LGBT communities. Based in Glasgow, OurStory Scotland is a recognised Scottish charity. Edwin Morgan became its first patron in 2005 and was succeeded by Jackie Kay in 2010. The archives and manuscript collections of the National Library of Scotland contain oral history recordings and personal testimonies collected by OurStory Scotland.

References

External links
OurStory Scotland

LGBT organisations in Scotland
Organisations based in Glasgow
History organisations based in Scotland
LGBT culture in Glasgow